The Team free routine competition of the 2016 European Aquatics Championships was held on 11 and 13 May 2016.

Results
The preliminary round was held at 09:00. The final was held on 13 May at 16:00.

References

Synchronised swimming